The Central Scientific Research Automobile and Automotive Engines Institute, abbreviated as NAMI is a scientific organization in Russia in the field of automotive industry development. The institute was awarded the Order of the Red Banner of Labour.

History 
The research and development automobile and engine institute was established on 14 March 1920, based on the Scientific Automobile Laboratory of Scientific and Technical department of VSNKh, which was established on 16 October 1918. starting at 1924, the institute permitted purchases of foreign automobiles and automobile accessories. The first original automobile, the NAMI 1, was developed in 1927 (the first car of the USSR).

During the 1930s the institute became the leading development department of the Soviet automotive industry. Following that year they developed and produced the first Soviet trolleybuses, and created several tractor models and several lorry models. For the Red Army half-tracks and armored vehicles had also been actively developed.

From 1931 to 1946 the institute bore the name Automobile and Tractor Research Institution.

At the beginning of 1946, because the tractor industry was transferred to be under the supervision of the Ministry of Agricultural Machinery, NATI was split in two. The automobile branch was kept under supervision of Ministry of Automobile Industry and was reorganized into Scientific and Research automobile and engine institute (NAMI). The tractor division was transferred under the supervision of the Ministry of Agricultural Machinery. This division served as a basis for the Union Tractor Research Institution (NATI).

Multiple experimental and prototype engines were developed at the institute, many of which served as the basis for the mass production ones. In the 1960s the Institute developed some front-wheel drive and automatic transmissions which weren't put into production until much later, as these were deemed too expensive and complex for the current state of the industry, citing the example of a GAZ-21 automatic transmission, for which the service infrastructure was virtually non-existent.

Post-Soviet era
In 2014 the NAMI purchased the Yo-Mobile project for 1 Euro.

In May 2018, NAMI unveiled for the first time in public the first generation of the "Kortezh" presidential state car for the fourth presidential inauguration of Vladimir Putin. It replaces the German-made cars that the government has been depending on for its VIPs since the end of ZIL production.

In May 2022, NAMI acquired Renault's controlling stake (about 68%) in the Russian car manufacturer AvtoVAZ.

Testing facility 
In the 1960s the testing facility of NAMI was opened, which is near Dmitrov, Moscow Oblast.

Prototypes 
The only period of NAMI vehicle production was the 1920s and 1930s. Since then the NAMI vehicles are exclusively prototypes and concept cars.

 1920 – BK – aerosan
 1921 – Tri-Ka – aerosan
 1927-1931 – NAMI-1, the first Soviet passenger car
 1928 – NAMI-1 – snowmobile
 1929 – Ford-A-NAMI - (also known as Ford Model K)
 1930 – NATI "Kar-a-Pet"
 1931 – NAMI-IX, aerosledge
 1932 – NATI-2 – half-track based on the GAZ-AA
 1932 – Ford-NATI-5 (also known as NATI-5) – half-track based on Ford-A
 1932 – Ford-NATI-30 (also known as GAZ-NATI-30) – prototype for GAZ-AAA
 1933 – NATI-3 – half-track based on the GAZ-AA
 1933 — NATI LK-1
 1934 – GAZ-A-NATI (also known as GAZ-A Kegress) – half-track based on GAZ-A
 1934 – NATI LK-2
 1934 – NATI-V – based on the GAZ-AA
 1935 – NATI-YaG-10
 1936 – NATI-V-3 (later NATI-VG) – half-track based on the GAZ-AA
 1936 – NATI-VZ – half-track based on the ZIS-5
 1937 – K-1 (also known as NATI-K1) – based on the ZIS-6; led to the ZIS-36
 1937 – NATI-VM – half-track based on the GAZ-M1
 1937 – NATI-V3 – based on the GAZ-AA
 1938 – K-2 (also known as NATI-K2) – two-axle version of K-1; cancelled in favor of the ZIS-32
 1938 – NATI-A, bus
 1939 – NATI-23A – based on the ZIS-5
 1940 – NATI-LB – based on the GAZ-62, became the LB-62
 1941 – NATI-K2 – based on the ZIS-5, led to the ZIS-32
 1941 – AR-NATI - the prototype for GAZ-64
 1947 – NAMI-010 – amphibious vehicle based on the GAZ-63
 1948 – Pobeda-NAMI – prototype improved version of GAZ-M20
 1948 – NAMI-LAZ-750/NAMI-LAZ-751
 1948 – NAMI-011 – based on the GAZ-67B, led to the GAZ-46
 1949 – NAMI-012 – steam truck based on the YaAZ-200
 1950 – NAMI-013 "Chita"
 1951 – NAMI-015/016 – based on the ZIS-151
 1951 – NAMI-018 – all-wheel-drive logging truck version of NAMI-012
 1955 – IMZ-NAMI-A50 "Belka" (Squirrel) – cancelled in favor of the ZAZ-965
 1956 – NAMI-020 – entered production as the Ural-375
 1956 – NAMI-021 – transport version of NAMI-020; prototype for Ural-375T
 1957 – NAMI-032G – prototype for LuAZ-967 and LuAZ-969
 1957-1958 – NAMI-031
 1958 – NAMI-044 – first Soviet wheeled tractor, became the KhTZ T-150K
 1958 – NAMI-048/048A
 1958 – NAMI-049 "Ogonyok" (Spark) – prototype for LuAZ-967
 1958 – NAMI-055/055B – based on the Moskvitch 410
 1958 – NAMI-058
 1958 – NAMI-059
 1959 – NAMI-041
 1959 – NAMI-053 "Turbo" – based on the ZIL-127
 1960 – NAMI-060 – cancelled in favor of the ZAZ-965
 1960 – NAMI-074
 1960 – NAMI S-3 – based on the Moskvitch 415
 1961 – NAMI-032M – entered production as the LuAZ-967
 1961 – NAMI-032S
 1961 – NAMI-049A "Tselina" 
 1961 – NAMI-055V
 1961 – NAMI-080
 1961 – NAMI-0102
 1961 – NAMI-787, trailer
 1962 – SMZ–NAMI-086 "Sputnik"
 1963 – NAMI-032B – prototype for ZAZ-969
 1963 – NAMI-076 "Ermak"
 1963 – NAMI-094 (ET-8) – based on the 1956 FWD Terracruzer

 1964 – NAMI-058T
 1964 – NAMI-092
 1965 – NAMI S-4 – based on UAZ-451
 1965 – NAMI S-3M
 1965 – NAMI-067 (M10), hovercraft
 1965 – NAMI-072
 1965 – NAMI-0100
 1965 – NAMI-0103
 1965 – NAMI-0105
 1965 – NAMI-0106
 1965 – NAMI-0112
 1966 – NAMI-032SK, hovercraft
 1966 – NAMI-058S-862
 1966 – NAMI-0107 "Vasilyok" (Cornflower)
 1966 – NAMI-0127
 1966 – NAMI-0143-SKhZ
 1967 – NAMI-0107B
 1968 – NAMI-072C
 1968 – NAMI-0114
 1968 – NAMI-0132
 1968 – NAMI-0137 – based on the ZAZ-966
 1968 – NAMI-0169
 1968 – NAMI-MeMZ-0127
 1969 – NAMI-0162 – transferred to IzhAuto and continued as the Izh-5 (Izh-4x4)
 1970 – NAMI-0145
 1971 – NAMI-0129
 1971 – NAMI-0173 – front-drive version of GAZ-24 Volga 
 1971 – NAMI-0157BK
 1973 – NAMI-0159 – based on the LAZ-696
 1976 – NAMI-0196
 1977 – NAMI-0157M – prototype for Ural-5920
 1977 – NAMI-UAZ-469B
 1981 – NAMI-0231 – prototype for VAZ-1111
 1984 – NAMI-0188
 1984 – NAMI-0266
 1985 – NAMI-0267
 1985 – NAMI-3305
 1987 – NAMI-0284 "Debyut" (Debut); first concept car developed during perestroika
 1987 – NAMI-0286 "Tayfun" (Typhoon)
 1988 – NAMI-0342 "Kuzya"
 1988–1989 – NAMI-LuAZ-Proto
 1988–1991 – NAMI-0290 "Apel'sin" (Orange) – based on ZAZ-1102
 1989 – NAMI-0281
 1989 – NAMI-0295 "Rus'"
 1990 – NAMI-0284 "Debyut-2"
 1990 – NAMI-0288 "Kompakt"
 1990 – NAMI-Kompakt-2
 1991 – NAMI-0300 "Apel'sin-2"
 1992 – NAMI "Oda" Concept
 1992 – Ekstremist
 1992–2000 – NAMI-1819 "Umka"
 1994 – NAMI-2160 "Kentavr"
 1994 – NAMI "Retro"
 1995 – NAMI-GAZ "Volga-Prestige"
 1997–1999 – NAMI "Grenader"
 1998 – NAMI-UAZ-469 "Huntsman"
 1999 – NAMI "Tachanka"
 2006 – NAMI-1337
 2006 – NAMI-2339
 2006 – NAMI-GAZ "Valdai"
 2011 – NAMI-3333
 2016 – NAMI "Shatl" (Shuttle)

References 

Research institutes in Russia
Research institutes in the Soviet Union
Motor vehicle manufacturers of Russia
Motor vehicle manufacturers of the Soviet Union
Federal State Unitary Enterprises of Russia
Companies based in Moscow
Russian brands
Luxury motor vehicle manufacturers
Contract vehicle manufacturers
Aurus Motors